SMNI News Channel is a Philippine free-to-air news television network based in Makati City. It is owned and operated by Swara Sug Media Corporation, the parent company of Sonshine Media Network International, a religious broadcasting arm of the Kingdom of Jesus Christ (KJC) led by Filipino televangelist and church leader, Pastor Apollo C. Quiboloy.

It airs national and international newscasts and talk shows, rolling news coverage from correspondents and reporters of SMNI Manila and other news bureaus in the Philippines and in more than 40 countries around the world and Kingdom-related programs.

It is exclusively aired over Digital terrestrial television on UHF Channel 43 in Metro Manila, UHF Channel 45 in Metro Baguio, UHF Channel 37 Metro Cagayan de Oro, and UHF Channel 19 in Davao Central, with selected programs simulcasting live via SMNI News Channel's Facebook page and YouTube channel, as well as on the main SMNI channel.

Programming

Current programs

News
Balita ng Bansa 
SMNI Newsblast 
SMNI Newsbreak
SMNI Nightline News 
Newsline World
Weekender World

Current affairs and commentary
Business and Politics with Dante "Klink" Ang II 
Dito sa Bayan ni Juan 
Gikan sa Masa Para Sa Masa 
Laban Kasama Ang Bayan 
Maki-Alam 
Pinoy Legal Minds 
Pulso ng Bayan 
Statecraft with Sass Rogando-Sasot 
SMNI Special Reports

Public service
Kabayan Abroad 
Problema N'yo Itawag kay Panelo 
SMNI Exclusive

Health and Infotainment Environment Edutainment
Eco Hour
Healthy Chat @ Sonshine
Ito ang Buhay (This is Life)
Mga Doktor ng Bayan 
Pa-Talk 
SMNI Entrepinoy Revolution With Dr. Carl Balita

Kingdom-related
Give Us This Day
Powerline
Quiet Moments
Sounds of Worship
Gospel of the Kingdom
SPOTLIGHT Live! Worldwide
Doctoral Conferment Of Pastor Apollo C. Quiboloy

DocumentaryA New Me Story of Hope and VictoryCaravan of LoveCartoonKingdom Force (2022)

DramaPapa, Nasaan Ka Na? (2023)

* - denotes that this program is also simulcast on its main channel, SMNI.

 Previous programs 
NewsSMNI Morning HeadlinesSMNI NewslineSMNI Newsline PhilippinesCurrent affairs and commentaryPoint of Order Usaping Bayan Thinking Pinoy on SMNI 

InfotainmentAmplify Your LifeKingdom-relatedGeneration KSpecialsElection Watch 2018: The SMNI News Special CoverageSMNI Presidential Debates 2022SMNI Senatorial Debates 2022On the Road with the FrontrunnerThe Deep Probe: The SMNI Presidential Candidates InterviewElection Watch 2019: The SMNI News Special CoverageElection Watch 2022: The SMNI News Special Coverage''

Subchannels

Notable broadcasters and anchors

Current anchors
 Pastor Apollo C. Quiboloy
 Rodrigo Duterte – 16th president of the Philippines
 Dante "Klink" Ang II – president and CEO of The Manila Times
 Lorraine Badoy – former NTF-ELCAC spokesperson
 Juan Ponce Enrile – Chief Presidential Legal Counsel
 Jesus "Mang Jess" Arranza – 2022 senatorial candidate
 Jeffrey Celis (Ka Eric) – former New People's Army (NPA) cadre
 Sass Rogando-Sasot – foreign relations scholar 
 MJ Mondejar 
 Admar Vilando 
 Dr. Carl Balita – 2022 senatorial candidate 
 Troy Gomez 
 Jade Calabroso 
 Salvador Panelo – former Chief Presidential Legal Counsel
 Ron Salo – Kabayan Partylist representative
 Arnell Ignacio – OWWA administrator
 Harry Roque – former presidential spokesperson
 Atty. Mark Tolentino
 Dr. Ted Herbosa – former National Task Force Against COVID-19 special adviser
 Greco Belgica  – former Presidential Anti-Corrpution Commission chairman

Former anchors
 Michael "Mike" Abe
 A news anchor and alleged lawyer who specifically dealt with the controversy on Vice Ganda's challenge to Quiboloy on possibly shutting down ABS-CBN as the pastor has claimed to have "stopped" the series of earthquakes in Mindanao in 2019. Now with Radyo Pilipinas 738. 
 Mike Defensor
 Rodante Marcoleta (now with Net 25)
 R. J. Nieto (Thinking Pinoy)
 Antonio Parlade Jr.

Administrative complaint 
SMNI is facing an administrative complaint filed in May 2022 before the National Telecommunications Commission (NTC). Concepcion Empeño and Erlinda Cadapan, the mothers of disappeared students Karen Empeño and Sherlyn Cadapan, and human rights group Karapatan petitioned the NTC to revoke Swara Sug Media Corporation's franchise, for airing on SMNI an interview with convicted kidnapper and retired Army General Jovito Palparan. The complainants said in a statement that the broadcast propagated disinformation in violation of Republic Act No. 11422 and the 2007 Broadcast Code of the Philippines. Palparan and program host Lorraine Badoy also red-tagged former vice president and then-presidential candidate Leni Robredo during the broadcast, which the complainants alleged were in violation of Commission on Elections' Resolution No. 10730 involving truth in advertising and fair and accurate reporting.

Controversies and criticism
According to a report by news website Rappler, the network allegedly fuels disinformation, misleading claims and propaganda to attack journalists and critics of the Duterte administration.

References

External links
 
SMNI News Channel on Facebook
SMNI News Channel on Twitter
SMNI News Channel on YouTube

Sonshine Media Network International
Digital television stations in the Philippines
Television channels and stations established in 2016
24-hour television news channels in the Philippines
Television networks in the Philippines
Religious television stations in the Philippines